Daniel is the designation for a French experimental rocket, a precursor to the Israeli Jericho ballistic missile. It consisted of 3 stages (first stage: SPRAN-50, second stage: Jericho, third stage: Mélanie) and was launched three times between 1959 and 1961 from the Ile de Levant. The Daniel reached a maximum height of 130 km and had a takeoff weight of 1000 kg, a diameter of 0.40 m and a length of 8.40 m

References 

Rockets and missiles